Songs and Bullets is a 1938 American Western film directed by Sam Newfield and written by George H. Plympton and Joseph O'Donnell. The film stars Fred Scott, Al St. John, Alyce Ardell, Charles King, Karl Hackett, Frank LaRue, Richard Cramer and Budd Buster. The film was released on May 15, 1938, by Spectrum Pictures.

Plot
Melody Smith arrives in town to find his uncle's killer and at the same time Du Mont also arrives in search of her father's murderer, the two have suspicious of Harry Skelton, but he has the Sheriff on his side and manages to arrest Melody.

Cast           
Fred Scott as Melody Smith
Al St. John as Fuzzy Martin
Alyce Ardell as Jeanette Du Mont 
Charles King as Sheriff
Karl Hackett as Harry Skelton 
Frank LaRue as Mr. Morgan
Richard Cramer as Outlaw Leader
Budd Buster as Zeke
Jimmy Aubrey as First Gunman
Lew Porter as Lew 
James Sheridan as Hired Gunman

References

External links
 

1938 films
1930s English-language films
American Western (genre) films
1938 Western (genre) films
Films directed by Sam Newfield
American black-and-white films
Films with screenplays by George H. Plympton
1930s American films